Esa mujer is an Argentine telenovela starring and produced by Andrea del Boca, and directed by her father Nicolás del Boca. It aired between 2013 and 2014 on Argentine public TV network.

The music theme in the series was the song "El amor es así", performed by Andrea del Boca and Gigi D'Alessio. Esa mujer was broadcast on weekdays at 2pm and its first episode attracted 2.5 million viewers on 9 December 2013. The series concluded on 27 May 2014 with 1.5 million viewers. Andrea Del Boca's role as well as the series itself were nominated to Martín Fierro Awards.

Cast
Andrea del Boca as Nicolasa Morales
Segundo Cernadas as Ignacio Acevedo
Esteban Meloni as Diego Acevedo
Miriam Lanzoni as Patricia López Zambrano
Roberto Carnaghi as Orlando López Zambrano
Brenda Gandini as Gisela Betsabé
Salo Pasik as Alfredo Morales
Victoria Carreras as Samantha Morales

References

External links
 

2013 telenovelas
2013 Argentine television series debuts
2014 Argentine television series endings
Argentine telenovelas
Spanish-language telenovelas
Televisión Pública original programming